Radiococcus is a genus of green algae in the family Radiococcaceae.

References

External links

Sphaeropleales genera
Sphaeropleales